"Restless" is a 1968 song written by Carl Perkins and released as a single on Columbia Records.

Background
The song was recorded on September 27, 1968, and released as a 45 single, 4-44723, on Columbia, in December, 1968, backed with "11-43", reaching no. 20 on the Billboard country chart. The recording, produced by Bill Denny and Larry Butler, also appeared on the May, 1969 Columbia LP Carl Perkins' Greatest Hits. The song also appeared on the 1992 Carl Perkins compilation album Restless: The Columbia Recordings. The song became a major hit again in 1991 in a new all-star recording by Mark O'Connor and The New Nashville Cats. Carl Perkins performed the song on the Kraft Music Hall episode hosted by Johnny Cash on April 16, 1969.

Notable recordings

George Thorogood and The Destroyers recorded the song on their 1980 studio album More George Thorogood and the Destroyers on Rounder Records. Emmylou Harris recorded the song in 1982 on the Last Date album. Ben Wasson recorded the song in 2009. Carl Perkins also recorded the song in a duet with Tom Petty and the Heartbreakers for the Go! Cat Go! album in 1996. Mark O'Connor had a Top 40 hit in 1991 in an all-star recording featuring Vince Gill, Ricky Skaggs, and Steve Wariner that reached no. 25 on the Billboard country chart in the U.S. and no. 19 on the Canadian country chart. The recording also won a Grammy Award for Best Country Collaboration with Vocals. American rockabilly legend Mac Curtis covered the song on his 2011 album Songs I Wish I Wrote, which sadly turned out to be his last album.

References

Sources

 Guterman, Jimmy. (1998.) "Carl Perkins." In The Encyclopedia of Country Music. Paul Kingsbury, Ed. New York: Oxford University Press. pp. 412–413.

.

Carl Perkins songs
1968 songs
Vince Gill songs
Ricky Skaggs songs
Steve Wariner songs
Songs written by Carl Perkins
Columbia Records singles
1968 singles
Vocal collaborations